Brian Briggs (29 March 1932 – 2 August 1996) was an English professional rugby league footballer who played in the 1950s and 1960s.

Background
Brian Briggs was born in Wakefield, West Riding of Yorkshire, England.

Playing career

Career at St Helens
Brian Briggs was a stalwart for St. Helens playing over 80 matches mostly in the  position. He was signed by St. Helens from Huddersfield on Friday 14 February 1958, and made his St. Helens début against Oldham on Saturday 15 February 1958. He was a hard running and tough tackling  who added great steel to the St. Helens pack at the time. In 83 matches for St. Helens Brian Briggs scored 4 tries, kicked 11 goals for a total points aggregate of 34 points. Brian Brigg's first try for St. Helens came at Hunslet as St. Helens cruised to a 33 points to two victory. Brian Briggs also had the pleasure of watching Tom van Vollenhoven notch four tries that particular day. On Tuesday 14 April 1959 Brian Briggs scored a try and kicked two goals as St. Helens thumped Hull F.C. at Knowsley Road in front of 18,500 spectators. Brian Briggs managed to earn two caps for Yorkshire whilst at St. Helens. He transferred to the emerging great Wakefield Trinity side of the early 1960s for £5,000 (based on increases in average earnings, this would be approximately £226,900 in 2013).

International honours
Brian Briggs, won a cap for England while at Huddersfield in 1956 against France, and won a cap for Great Britain while at Huddersfield in 1954 against New Zealand.

County honours
Brian Briggs won cap(s) for Yorkshire while at Wakefield Trinity.

Challenge Cup Final appearances
Brian Briggs played left-, i.e. number 11, in Wakefield Trinity's 12–6 victory over Huddersfield in the 1962 Challenge Cup Final during the 1961–62 season at Wembley Stadium, London on Saturday 12 May 1962.

County Cup Final appearances
Brian Briggs played left-, i.e. number 11, in Huddersfield's 15–8 victory over York in the 1957 Yorkshire County Cup Final during the 1957–58 season at Headingley Rugby Stadium, Leeds on Saturday 19 October 1957, played left- in St. Helens 2–12 defeat by Oldham in the 1958 Lancashire County Cup Final during the 1958–59 season at Central Park, Wigan on Saturday 25 October 1958, played left- in the 4–5 defeat by Warrington in the 1959 Lancashire County Cup Final during the 1959–60 season at Central Park, Wigan on Saturday 31 October 1959, Left- in Wakefield Trinity's 16–10 victory over Huddersfield in the 1960 Yorkshire County Cup Final during the 1960–61 season at Headingley Rugby Stadium, Leeds on Saturday 29 October 1960, and played left- in the 19–9 victory over Leeds in the 1961 Yorkshire County Cup Final during the 1961–62 season at Odsal Stadium, Bradford on Saturday 11 November 1961.

References

External links
Profile at saints.org.uk
Wakefield Win Cup 1962
Fender gets the plaudits

1932 births
1996 deaths
England national rugby league team players
English rugby league players
Great Britain national rugby league team players
Huddersfield Giants players
Rugby league second-rows
Rugby league players from Wakefield
St Helens R.F.C. players
Wakefield Trinity players
York Wasps players
Yorkshire rugby league team players